The Lipp Barn, located at 17054 130th Ave. in Collyer, Kansas, was built in 1917.  It was listed on the National Register of Historic Places in 2009.

It is a Midwest Prairie-style barn. It is two-stories tall with a gambrel roof.

References

Barns on the National Register of Historic Places in Kansas
Buildings and structures completed in 1917
Trego County, Kansas
Barns in Kansas